Surrey is a county in South East England. 

Surrey may also refer to:

Places

Australia
Surry Hills, New South Wales
Surrey Hills, Victoria

Canada
Surrey, British Columbia

Jamaica
Surrey, Jamaica

United States
Surrey, Indiana
Surrey, North Dakota
Surrey Township, Michigan

Other
HMS Surrey, a planned County-class heavy cruiser, ordered in 1929 but cancelled in 1930
Surrey (carriage), a four-wheeled open carriage often with a canopy
Surrey County Cricket Club in Surrey, England
University of Surrey in Surrey, England
Surrey Park, a sports complex in Invercargill, New Zealand
Surry (1811 ship), a convict ship also commonly called the Surrey
Earl of Surrey, an English title
Henry Howard, Earl of Surrey, an English Renaissance poet